Polk County Courthouse may refer to:

 Polk County Courthouse (Arkansas), Mena, Arkansas
 Old Polk County Courthouse (Florida), Bartow, Florida
 Polk County Courthouse (Iowa), Des Moines, Iowa
 Polk County Courthouse (Nebraska), Osceola, Nebraska
 Polk County Courthouse (North Carolina), Columbus, North Carolina
 Polk County Courthouse (Tennessee), Benton, Tennessee
 Polk County Courthouse and 1905 Courthouse Annex, Livingston, Texas
 Polk County Courthouse (Wisconsin), Balsam Lake, Wisconsin
 Geiger Building (Osceola, Wisconsin), also known as the Old Polk County Courthouse,  listed on the National Register of Historic Places

See also
Polk County (disambiguation)